130 (one hundred [and] thirty) is the natural number following 129 and preceding 131.

In mathematics
130 is a sphenic number. It is a noncototient since there is no answer to the equation x - φ(x) = 130.

130 is the only integer that is the sum of the squares of its first four divisors, including 1: 12 + 22 + 52 + 102 = 130.

130 is the largest number that cannot be written as the sum of four hexagonal numbers.

130 equals both 27 + 2 and 53 + 5 and is therefore a doubly strictly  number.

In religion
The Book of Genesis states Adam had Seth at the age of 130.
The Second Book of Chronicles says that Jehoiada died at the age of 130.

In other fields
One hundred [and] thirty is also:
 The year AD 130 or 130 BC
 The 130 nanometer process is a semiconductor process technology by semiconductor companies
 A 130-30 fund or a ratio up to 150/50 is a type of collective investment vehicle
 The C130 Hercules aircraft

References

See also 
 List of highways numbered 130
 United Nations Security Council Resolution 130
 130 Liberty Street, New York City

Integers